The Rebellions of 1837–1838, were two armed uprisings that took place in Lower and Upper Canada in 1837 and 1838. Both rebellions were motivated by frustrations with lack of political reform. A key shared goal was responsible government, which was eventually achieved in the incidents' aftermath. The rebellions led directly to Lord Durham's Report on the Affairs of British North America and to the Act of Union 1840 which partially reformed the British provinces into a unitary system and eventually led to the British North America Act, 1867, which created the contemporary Canadian federation and its government.

Atlantic context
Some historians contend that the rebellions in 1837 ought to be viewed in the wider context of the late-18th- and early-19th-century Atlantic revolutions. The American Revolutionary War of 1775–83, the French Revolution of 1789–99, the Haitian Revolution of 1791–1804, the Irish Rebellion of 1798 and the rebellions in Spanish America (1810–25) were inspired by republican ideals, but whether the rebels would have gone so far as to usurp the Crown remains a subject for historical debate. Great Britain's Chartists sought the same democratic goals.
Historians have tended to view the two Canadian rebellions and the subsequent US Patriot War in isolation, without reference to each other, and without reference to the republican impetus they shared. Recent reconsiderations have emphasized that this was a purposeful forgetfulness by the Reformers after the Rebellions, as they attempted to repudiate the bold republicanism of William Lyon Mackenzie, yet steer an acceptable course to national independence under the guise of responsible government. Ducharme (2006) puts the rebellion in 1837 in the context of the Atlantic Revolutions. He argues that Canadian reformers took their inspiration from the republicanism of the American Revolution. The rebels believed that the right of citizens to participate in the political process through the election of representatives was the most important right, and they sought to make the legislative council elective rather than appointed. Rebellion in Upper Canada (and Lower Canada also) broke out after the 1836 Legislative Assembly elections were corrupted. It seemed then that the reformers' struggles could only be settled outside the framework of existing colonial institutions. The British military crushed the rebellions, ending any possibility the two Canadas would become republics. Some historians see ties to the Chartist Newport Uprising of 1839 in Wales, suppressed by Sir Francis Bond Head's cousin, Sir Edmund Walker Head.

Rebellions

There were two types of rebellions in Upper and Lower Canada. Many of the rebels (including Mackenzie) fled to the United States. Mackenzie established a short-lived "Republic of Canada" on Navy Island in the Niagara River, but withdrew from armed conflict soon thereafter. Charles Duncombe and Robert Nelson, in contrast, helped foment a largely American militia, the Hunters' Lodge/Frères chasseurs, which organized a convention in Cleveland in September 1838 to declare another Republic of Lower Canada. The Hunters' Lodges drew on the American members of the radical Equal Rights Party (or "Locofocos"). This organization launched the "Patriot War", which was suppressed only with the help of the American government. The raids did not end until the rebels and Hunters were defeated at the decisive Battle of Windsor, nearly a year after the first defeat near Montgomery's Tavern.

Similarities

The constitutions of Upper and Lower Canada differed greatly, but shared a basis on the principle of "mixed monarchy"—a balance of monarchy, aristocracy and democracy. The colonies, however, lacked the aristocratic element, and found their non-elective Legislative Councils dominated by local oligarchies that controlled local trade and the institutions of state and religion. In Lower Canada they were known as the Château Clique; in Upper Canada they were known as the Family Compact. Both office-holding oligarchies were affiliated with more broadly based "Tory parties" and opposed by a Reform opposition that demanded a radically more democratic government than existed in each colony.

The governments in both provinces were viewed by the Reformers as illegitimate. In Lower Canada acute conflict between the elected and appointed elements of the legislature brought all legislation to a halt, leaving the Tories to impose Lord John Russell's Ten Resolutions, allowing them to rule without accountability to electors. In Upper Canada the 1836 elections had been marred by political violence and fraud organized by the new Lt. Governor, Sir Francis Bond Head. William Lyon Mackenzie and Samuel Lount lost their seats in the result. The Tories passed a bill allowing them to continue to sit in disregard of the established practice of dissolving the House on the death of a monarch (William IV died in June 1837).

In the midst of this crisis of legitimacy, the Atlantic economy was thrown into recession, with the greatest impact being on farmers. These farmers barely survived widespread crop failures in 1836–37, and now faced lawsuits from merchants trying to collect old debts. The collapse of the international financial system imperiled trade and local banks, leaving large numbers in abject poverty.

In response, Reformers in each province organized radical democratic "political unions." The Political Union movement in Britain was largely credited with the passing of the Great Reform Bill of 1832. In Lower Canada the Patriots organized the Société des Fils de la Liberté ("Sons of Liberty"). William Lyon Mackenzie helped organize the Toronto Political Union in July 1837. Both organizations became the vehicles for politically organizing protests, and eventually rebellion. As the situation in Lower Canada approached crisis the British concentrated their troops there, making it apparent that they planned on using armed force against the Patriots. With no troops left in Upper Canada, an opportunity for a sympathetic revolt was opened.

Differences

Since the time of Lord Durham's Report on the Rebellions, the Lower Canada Rebellion has been attributed to tensions between the British and the French, that the conflict was "'racial' and, as a consequence, it was sharper than–indeed fundamentally different from—the milder strife that disturbed 'English' [speaking] Upper Canada." Despite being true, this interpretation understates the republicanism of the Patriots.

The Lower Canada rebellion was widely supported by the populace, due to economic and political subordination of the French Canadians, resulting in mass actions over an extended period of time, such as boycotts, strikes and sabotage. These drew harsh punitive reprisals such as the restriction of civil liberties, the burning of entire villages, and imprisonment or exile of hundreds of men by government troops and militias, which had been concentrated in Lower Canada to deal with the crisis. By contrast, the Upper Canada Rebellion was not as broadly supported by local populations, was quickly quelled by relatively small numbers of pro-government militias and volunteers and was consequently less widespread and brutal by comparison.

Aftermath

Those rebels who were arrested in Upper Canada following the 1837 uprisings were put on trial, and most were found guilty of insurrection against the Crown. One of the most severe punishments was the sentencing of 100 Canadian rebels and American sympathizers to life in Britain's Australian prison colonies. Many were publicly hanged, most notably Samuel Lount and Peter Matthews. The public hangings of the rebels took place in Court House Square, in between Toronto's new jail and courthouse. The Foreman of Public Works, Joseph Sheard, was expected to share in the work of building the scaffold for Lount's and Matthews' execution. However, he claimed the men had done nothing that he wouldn't have and refused to assist. The Orange militia stood guard during the execution to deter a rescue.

The root cause of resentment in Upper Canada was not so much against distant rulers in Britain, but rather against the corruption and injustice by local politicians—the so-called "Family Compact". However, the rebels were not really convicted because their views aligned with the liberalism of the US, and thus caused some kind of offence to the Tory values of the Canadian colonies. Rather, as revealed in the ruling of Chief Justice Sir John Robinson, a Lockean justification was given for the prisoners' condemnation, and not a Burkean one: the Crown, as protector of the lives, liberty and prosperity of its subjects, could "legitimately demand allegiance to its authority." Robinson went on to say that those who preferred republicanism over monarchism were free to emigrate, and thus the participants in the uprisings were guilty of treason.

After the rebellions died down, more moderate reformers, such as the political partners Robert Baldwin and Louis-Hippolyte Lafontaine, gained credibility as an alternative voice to the radicals. They proved to be influential when the British government sent Lord Durham, a prominent reformer, to investigate the cause of the troubles. Among the recommendations in his report was the establishment of responsible government for the colonies, one of the rebels' original demands (although it was not achieved until 1849). Durham also recommended the merging of Upper and Lower Canada into a single political unit, the Province of Canada (established through the Act of Union 1840), which became the nucleus for modern-day Canada.  More controversially, he recommended the government-sponsored cultural assimilation of French Canadians to the English language and culture. In fact, the merging of the Upper and Lower Canada was intended to take any form of self-government away from the French Canadians, forcing them into becoming a smaller part of the new, larger, political unit.

In geopolitical terms the Rebellions and the subsequent Patriot War altered the landscape of relations between Britain and British colonial authorities on one hand, and the American government on the other. Both nations were dedicated to a peace policy due to a budding financial crisis and to a sense of perceived disadvantage which both felt equally. Both were legitimately concerned about the disruption in relations which radical ideas might foment through further rebellion and raids. An unprecedented level of cooperation occurred in diplomatic and military circles. Far from the Rebellions being entirely domestic events, the administration of American president Martin Van Buren had little choice but to implement mitigating measures on US soil to prevent escalation. As they evolved into the Patriot War, the Rebellions contributed to the construction of more recent Anglo-American and Canada-US relations.

Legacy
In 1937, exactly one century after the Rebellion, the names of William Mackenzie and Louis-Joseph Papineau were applied to the Mackenzie–Papineau Battalion or the Mac-Paps, a battalion of officially unrecognised Canadian volunteers who fought on the Republican side in Spain during the Spanish Civil War. In memory of their heritage, the group fought to the rallying cry "The Spirit of 1837 Lives on!"

See also
History of Canada
Military history of Canada
American Revolution

References

Further reading

 Brown, Richard. Rebellion in Canada, 1837–1885: Autocracy, Rebellion and Liberty (Volume 1) ((2012) excerpt volume 1; Rebellion in Canada, 1837–1885, Volume 2: The Irish, the Fenians and the Metis (2012) excerpt for volume 2
 Buckner, Phillip. 2020. "The Canadian Civil Wars of 1837–1838." London Journal of Canadian Studies.
 
 
 Greer, Allan.  The patriots and the people: the rebellion of 1837 in rural Lower Canada ] University of Toronto Press,  (2003) excerpt and text search
Schull, Joseph. Rebellion: The Rising in French Canada, 1837 (1996)

Primary sources
 Greenwood, F. Murray, and Barry Wright (2 vol 1996, 2002) Canadian state trials – Rebellion and invasion in the Canadas, 1837–1839 Society for Canadian Legal History by University of Toronto Press,

External links
 Chart of British Regiments serving in the Canadian Rebellions of 1837–1838
 Chronology and quotes
 The 1837–1838 Rebellion in Lower Canada, Images from the McCord Museum's collections, access-date 2006-12-10
 To the Outskirts of Habitable Creation: Americans and Canadians Transported To Tasmania in the 1840s by Stuart D. Scott and Illustrated by Seth Colby.
 The Rebellion of 1837 in Upper Canada: A Collection of Documents. Edited by Colin Read and Ronald J. Stagg and Published by the Champlain Society, 1985.

 
Political history of Canada
Canadian Militia